Calatola columbiana is a species of flowering plant in the family Metteniusaceae. It was formerly placed in the family Icacinaceae. It is endemic to Colombia.

References

 Calderon, E. 1998.  Calatola columbiana.   2006 IUCN Red List of Threatened Species.   Downloaded on 20 August 2007.

Metteniusaceae
Endemic flora of Colombia
Endangered plants
Taxonomy articles created by Polbot